"Domy na zbúranie" is a song by Marika Gombitová released by OPUS Records in 1980.
 
The single was written by Janko Lehotský and Kamil Peteraj, and issued initially on the various artists' compilation OPUS '79. An international version of the song was entitled "Lonely Night" in English, and attached to the Modus first export album. In 1997, the composition was remixed by Laco Lučenič to be released on the remix compilation Good Vibes: Remixes.

Official versions
 "Domy na zbúranie" - Original version, 1979
 "Lonely Night" - International version, 1980
 "Domy na zbúranie (Vital Remix) - Remixed version, 1997

Credits and personnel
 Marika Gombitová - lead vocal
 Janko Lehotský - writer 
 Kamil Peteraj - lyrics
 Ján Lauko - producer
 OPUS - copyright

References

General

Specific

External links 
 
 

1980 songs
1980 singles
Marika Gombitová songs
Modus (band) songs
Songs written by Ján Lehotský
Songs written by Kamil Peteraj
Slovak-language songs
English-language Slovak songs